The Way and Color is the second studio album by American band TEEN. It was released in April 2014 under Carpark Records.

Track listing

References

2014 albums
Teen (band) albums
Carpark Records albums